Lay It All on Me is the third solo album by James Christian, released on July 5, 2013.

Track listing
 "Lay It All On Me" (James Christian, Jeff Kent) - 4:49
 "Sacred Heart" (James Christian, Jeff Kent) - 3:39
 "Day in the Sun" (Chris Pelcer, Dexter Green) - 3:34
 "Believe in Me" (James Christian, Chris Pelcer) - 3:32
 "You're So Bad" (James Christian, Jeff Kent, Tommy Denander) - 4:06
 "Don't Come Near Me" (James Christian, Jeff Kent, Jimi Bell) - 4:41
 "Let It Shine" (James Christian, Jeff Kent) - 4:23
 "She's All the Rage" (James Christian, Jeff Kent, Jimi Bell) - 4:06
 "Sincerely Yours" (James Christian, Jeff Kent, Tommy Denander) - 3:56
 "Another Shot in the Dark" (James Christian, Jeff Kent, Tommy Denander) - 3:40
 "Welcome to Your Future" (James Christian, Jeff Kent, Jimi Bell) - 4:42

Personnel
James Christian - lead vocals, acoustic guitar, bass guitar
Jimi Bell - guitar
Jorge Salas - guitar
Shelby Stewarr - guitar
B.J. Zampa - drums
David Sherman - drums

Additional musicians
Jeff Kent - keyboards
Robin Beck - backing vocals

References

James Christian albums
2013 albums